Micromyrtus arenicola is a plant species of the family Myrtaceae endemic to Western Australia.

It is found in the Mid West region of Western Australia between Chapman Valley and Northampton.

References

arenicola
Endemic flora of Western Australia
Myrtales of Australia
Rosids of Western Australia
Plants described in 2010
Taxa named by Barbara Lynette Rye